Leela Damodara Menon (4 January 1923 – 10 October 1995) was an Indian politician. She was a Member of Parliament, representing Kerala in the Rajya Sabha the upper house of India's Parliament as a member of the Indian National Congress.

Biography
Leela was born on January 4, 1923, the daughter of K. U. Krishnan Nair.

In June 12, 1941, Leela married K. A. Damodara Menon, who was active in Kerala politics. The couple have three children.

Leela also held several other positions including treasurer of the Congress Party Treasurer from 1957 to 1959, Convener of the All India Congress Committee, Senator of the University of Madras, Senator of the University of Kerala, Representative of India to the Human Rights Commission, Vice-Chairman of the Human Rights Commission (India) and General Secretary of the All India Women's Conference.

Electoral politics
In the first elections to the Kerala Legislative Assembly in 1957, Leela contested from Kunnamangalam and her husband Damodara Menon from Perumbavur, in which he lost and she won. In the second Kerala Assembly elections of 1960, Leela contested from Kunnamangalam and her husband Damodara Menon from Paravur, as Indian National Congress candidates, and both of whom won. She served as the member of Rajya Sabha from 1974 to 1980.

Awards and honors
Leela received the Kerala Sahithya Akademi Award for her autobiography named Chettante Nizhalil.

References

1923 births
1995 deaths
Rajya Sabha members from Kerala
Indian National Congress politicians from Kerala
Women members of the Kerala Legislative Assembly
Recipients of the Kerala Sahitya Akademi Award
Kerala MLAs 1957–1959
Kerala MLAs 1960–1964
Kerala MLAs 1987–1991
Women members of the Rajya Sabha
St. Teresa's College alumni